Karval is an unincorporated community and a U.S. Post Office in Lincoln County, Colorado, United States.  The Karval Post Office has the ZIP Code 80823.

Description
A post office called Karval has been in operation since 1911. The community derives its name from G. K. Kravig, a pioneer settler.

Geography
Karval is located at  (38.733197,-103.537045).

Climate
According to the Köppen Climate Classification system, Karval has a cold semi-arid climate, abbreviated "BSk" on climate maps.

See also

References

External links

 Karval Community Alliance, Inc.

Unincorporated communities in Lincoln County, Colorado
Unincorporated communities in Colorado